The  2018 Women’s European Boxing Championships was hosted and organized by the Bulgarian Boxing Association in Asics Arena, Sofia, Bulgaria in 2018. The event was held from 5 to 12 June 2018. The tournament was organized in association with the European Boxing Confederation (EUBC).

Medal table

Medal winners

Participating nations 
146 boxers from 32 nations competed.

 (2)
 (1)
 (8)
 (7)
 (3)
 (5)
 (2)
 (4)
 (3)
 (6)
 (1)
 (9)
 (3)
 (9)
 (3)
 (8)
 (1)
 (2)
 (2)
 (1)
 (3)
 (2)
 (8)
 (6)
 (10)
 (1)
 (4)
 (6)
 (4)
 (10)
 (10)
 (2)

References

Links
 Results

Women's European Amateur Boxing Championships
Boxing
Sports competitions in Sofia
Boxing
Boxing
Boxing
European
2010s in Sofia